Sicily Sewell (born October 1, 1985) is an  American chef, restaurateur, television producer, and former actress. She is sometimes credited in film or television as simply with a mononym Sicily. Following the birth of two daughters, Sewell became a restaurateur.

Television and film career

She made her television appearance on an Emmy Award-winning episode of Sesame Street when she was eight years old.

She played "Young Aisha" in a two-part episode of Season 2 of Mighty Morphin Power Rangers called "Rangers Back In Time", as well as in the 10 part mini series Mighty Morphin Alien Rangers.

She starred as young Diana in the hit miniseries, Mama Flora's Family in 1998, and as Angela Bassett's niece in the film How Stella Got Her Groove Back.

For 4 seasons, Sewell portrayed Spirit Jones, the best friend of Breanna Barnes (played by Kyla Pratt) in the sitcom One on One. Citing a decision by UPN to move in a different direction for the fifth season, Sicily was let go from One on One on June 20, 2005. This change came at a time when she was only nine episodes away from syndication.

Sewell also appeared in the Lifetime original movie Fighting the Odds: The Marilyn Gambrell Story alongside Ernie Hudson, Edwin Hodge and Jami Gertz in August 2005.

Chef and restaurateur

Sewell's family has a long tradition of skilled cookery.  She has told interviewers she is much happier as a chef and restaurateur than she was an actor.

In 2010, while Sewell was attending the Hollywood campus of Le Cordon Bleu College of Culinary Arts, she was an intern at the Los Angeles Times Test Kitchen.  Sewell subsequently graduated, with honours.

Sewell and her mother are co-owners of a soul food restaurant known as Pinky and Red's, in Berkeley, California. In late 2019 Sewell was hired as the chef of a high-profile restaurant known as Colors, in New York City.

Filmography

References

External links

1985 births
Actresses from Michigan
Living people
People from Pontiac, Michigan
20th-century American actresses
21st-century American actresses
American television actresses
African-American actresses
American film actresses
American child actresses
Alumni of Le Cordon Bleu
American restaurateurs
20th-century African-American women
20th-century African-American people
21st-century African-American women
21st-century African-American people